Rayaq - Haouch Hala, also romanized Rayak, is a Lebanese town in the Beqaa Governorate near the city of Zahlé. In the early 20th century and up to 1975 and the outbreak of the civil war, it was Lebanon's most important railway center, where the 1.05-m Beirut–Damascus line met the standard-gauge line north to Baalbek, Homs, and Aleppo. It now has an air base and a hospital. Rayak Air Base was bombed by the Israeli Air Force during the 2006 Lebanon War. The landing strip was severely damaged as a result.

General information 

Altitude: 930 m 
Latitude: 33.85
Longitude: 36
Latitude (DMS): 33° 51' 0 N
Longitude (DMS): 36° 0' 0 E

Area: 332 hectares
Location: 176 x 212 Zip Code: 51311 
Population: 3,349 
Number of Homes: 1,200 
Companies: 18

Distances:
From Zahleh 11 km
From Beirut 60 km

Archaeology
Flint tools were found there by Lorraine Copeland and Frank Skeels during a survey of 1965. Along with the Shepherd Neolithic series of blade-butts and end-scrapers, another series of large cores and flakes were found that Henri Fleisch considered similar to materials found at Serain and Fleywe that were of a confusing typology judged to be possibly Mousterian, Levalloiso-Mousterian or Heavy Neolithic.

History
In 1838, Eli Smith noted both  Reyak and Haush Hala as Christian villages in the Baalbek area.

References

Bibliography

External links
Rayaq - Haouch Hala,  Lebanon Tourist Guide
Riyaq - Haouch Hala,  Localiban
 Rayak on geographic.org
 Old Rolling stock in Riyak yards

  
 

Populated places in Zahlé District
Archaeological sites in Lebanon
Great Rift Valley
Beqaa Valley
Shepherd Neolithic sites
Heavy Neolithic sites